The men's 110 metres hurdles event at the 1973 Summer Universiade was held at the Central Lenin Stadium in Moscow on 16, 17 and 18 August.

Medalists

Results

Heats

Wind: Heat 3: +0.2 m/s

Semifinals

Final

Wind: 0.0 m/s

References

Athletics at the 1973 Summer Universiade
1973